Samone is a comune (municipality) in the Metropolitan City of Turin in the Italian region Piedmont, located about  north of Turin.

Samone borders the following municipalities: Fiorano Canavese, Banchette, Salerano Canavese, Loranzè, Pavone Canavese, and Colleretto Giacosa.

Demographic evolution

References

Cities and towns in Piedmont